This is a list of division results for the 2019 Australian federal election in the Australian Capital Territory and the Northern Territory.

Australian Capital Territory

Overall results

Results by division

Bean

Canberra

Fenner

Northern Territory

Overall results

Results by division

Lingiari

Solomon

References

2019 Australian federal election
Territories 2019